The Annunciation Monastery is a Cultural Monument of Albania, located in Vanistër, Gjirokastër County.

References

Cultural Monuments of Albania
Buildings and structures in Dropull